Ara Vardanyan may refer to:

Ara Vardanyan (administrator) (born 1977), executive director of the Hayastan All Armenian Fund
Ara Vardanyan (weightlifter) (born 1974), Armenian weightlifter

See also
Vardanyan (disambiguation)
Ara Vartanian, Brazilian jeweller